Kerfoot Moses Griner (January 12, 1899 – January 18, 1963), known as K. Griner, was a politician in the state of Florida. He served in the Florida House of Representatives from 1951 to 1954 and 1939, as a Democrat, representing Dixie County.

References

1899 births
1963 deaths
Democratic Party members of the Florida House of Representatives
People from Dixie County, Florida
20th-century American politicians